Dhapai  is a village in Kapurthala district of Punjab State, India. The village is administrated by a Sarpanch, who is an elected representative.

Demography 
According to the 2011 Census of India, Dhapai then had a 265 houses and a population of 1,208, comprising 635 males and 573 females. The literacy rate was 81.76%, higher than state average of 75.84%.  The population of children under the age of 6 years was 106 and the child sex ratio was approximately  536, lower than state average of 846. The population included 27.4 percent who were designated as Scheduled Castes. There were none designated as Scheduled Tribes.

Air travel connectivity 
The closest airport to the village is Sri Guru Ram Dass Jee International Airport.

Villages in Kapurthala

External links
  Villages in Kapurthala
 Kapurthala Villages List

References

Villages in Kapurthala district